In 1956, Billboard magazine published three charts covering the best-performing country music songs in the United States.  At the start of the year, the charts were published under the titles Most Played in Juke Boxes, Best Sellers in Stores, and Most Played By Jockeys, with the genre denoted in an overall page heading.  With effect from the issue of Billboard dated June 30, the genre was added to the specific titles of the charts, which were thus published as Most Played C&W in Juke Boxes, C&W Best Sellers in Stores, and Most Played C&W By Jockeys, the C&W standing for "country and western".  All three charts are considered part of the lineage of the current Hot Country Songs chart, which was first published in 1958.

The number-one positions on both the juke box and best sellers charts were dominated in 1956 by Elvis Presley, who spent a total of 26 weeks in the top spot on the best sellers listing and 28 weeks (including one tied with another single) atop the juke box chart with four different singles.  Presley achieved the first country chart-topper of his career in February when he reached the number one spot on the best sellers chart with "I Forgot to Remember to Forget"; its B-side, "Mystery Train" was listed jointly at number one for the first week of the run only.  The release was the final single which he recorded for Sun Records, the label for which he had honed his early rockabilly style.  After he signed for new label RCA Victor, his recordings began to show more of a pop music influence, but for a time continued to appear on the country charts, and one week after "I Forgot to Remember to Forget" was replaced at number one, Presley regained the top spot with the two-sided success "Heartbreak Hotel" / "I Was the One", which remained atop the listing for 17 consecutive weeks.  He would go on to be regarded as the most successful and influential recording artist of all time and feted as the "King of Rock and Roll".

Presley's songs were less successful on the jockeys chart: "Heartbreak Hotel" was his only number one on the airplay-based listing.  During the second half of the year, the jockeys chart was dominated by "Crazy Arms" by Ray Price, which spent 20 non-consecutive weeks at number one, a single week short of the record for the most weeks spent atop one of Billboards country charts by a single song.  Despite its popularity on the radio, Price's song spent only a single week at number one on the juke box chart.  In addition to Presley, five other artists reached number one for the first time, two of whom were among his fellow members of the so-called "Million Dollar Quartet" of early rock and roll stars: Carl Perkins and Johnny Cash.  Perkins gained his first country chart-topper with a song which would go on to be considered a rock and roll standard,  "Blue Suede Shoes".  Cash achieved the first of his thirteen country number ones when he topped the juke box chart with "I Walk the Line", a track which Rolling Stone magazine ranked as the greatest country song of all time in 2014, and its flip side "Get Rhythm".  Price, Red Sovine and the Louvin Brothers also achieved their debut chart-toppers in 1956.  "Singing the Blues" by Marty Robbins was the year's final number one on all three charts.

Chart history
In 1956, Billboard sometimes listed both sides of a single jointly at number one on the Best Sellers and Juke Box charts, based on a methodology which combined the survey data for both songs if "significant action [was] reported on both sides of a record".  This does not indicate that the single was officially released or promoted as a double A-side.

Notes
a.  B-side "Mystery Train" listed jointly at number one in the March 3 issue only
b.  Both sides listed jointly at number one
c.  "I Was the One" not listed jointly at number one in the April 19, June 16 and July 7 issues
d.  Two singles tied for number one on the juke box chart.
e.  B-side "My Baby Left Me" listed jointly at number one in the July 21 issue only
f.  B-side "You Done Me Wrong" listed jointly at number one in the July 28 issue only
g.  The Jockeys and Juke Box charts in this issue have the wrong headings, but which is really which can be deduced from the "last week" placings in this issue and the next as well as the fact that only one of the two charts permitted both sides of a single to be listed jointly.

See also
1956 in music
1956 in country music
List of artists who reached number one on the U.S. country chart

References

1956
Country
1956 record charts